Walton Hall Park in Walton, Liverpool, England is a  park. It was opened to the public on 18 July 1934 by King George V when he visited Liverpool to open the Queensway Tunnel. The origins of the park date back to Henry de Walton, steward of the West Derby hundred in 1199.

The park contains two lakes. The larger lake has two islands and is inhabited by several large carps, bream and tench fishes as well as a large amount of skimmer breams, roaches and perches. The smaller lake has a path running around the perimeter.

Since September 2019 Everton L.F.C. of the FA Women's Super League have played their home games at the main grandstand.

See also
Walton Hall, Liverpool

References

External links

Council Page
Photographs
Walton Hall Park show

Parks and commons in Liverpool